2AP or variation, may refer to:

 2-Acetyl-1-pyrroline, an aroma compound and flavor 
 2ap, codename for the Greek Biblical Codex Basilensis A. N. IV. 4
 Televise Samoa & Radio 2AP, a Samoan TV and radio station, now part of the Samoa Broadcasting Corporation

See also

 
 AP (disambiguation)
 AAP (disambiguation)
 APAP (disambiguation)
 AP2 (disambiguation)